Kate Hudson is an American actress.

Kate Hudson may also refer to:

 Kate Hudson (activist), UK academic and political activist

See also
 Katy Hudson or Katy Perry (born 1984) American pop singer
 Katy Hudson (album), 2001 eponymously named debut album
 Kathryn Hudson (born 1949) UK politician
 Hudson (disambiguation)